Erle is a rural locality (a settlement) in Yaksatovsky Selsoviet, Privolzhsky District, Astrakhan Oblast, Russia. The population was 79 in 2010. There are three streets.

Geography 
Erle is located on the Kigach River, 36 km southwest of Nachalovo (the district's administrative centre) by road. Atal is the nearest rural locality.

References 

Rural localities in Privolzhsky District, Astrakhan Oblast